Marchand de cailloux is a studio album from French artist Renaud. It was released in 1991 and seen as a return to form after the less positive reviews for the previous album, Putain de camion.

In this album Renaud again takes up socio-political themes. Le Tango des Élus mocks politicians, La ballade nord-irlandaise is a pacifist song evoking the troubles of Northern Ireland (later reprised in 2009's Molly Malone – Balade irlandaise), and 500 connards sur la ligne de départ makes fun of the "morons" who race in the African desert (i.e. the Paris-Dakar Rally), oblivious to the misery surrounding them.

Track listing
"Marchand de cailloux"
"L'aquarium"
"P'tit voleur"
"Olé"
"Les dimanches à la con"
"Dans ton sac"
"Le tango des élus"
"La ballade nord-irlandaise"
"500 connards sur la ligne de départ"
"Tonton"
"Je cruel"
"C'est pas du pipeau"
"Ma chanson leur a pas plu" (Suite)
"Tant qu'il y aura des ombres"

Reception

The album received positive reviews.

"Ma chanson leur a pas plu" (suite) is a sequel to the song on Morgane de toi. Tracks 1 and 3 were included on the 2007 compilation The Meilleur Of Renaud. Track 8 was covered for the tribute album La Bande à Renaud.

References

1991 albums
Renaud albums